Pierre Gourrier (born 2 March 1947) is a French weightlifter. He competed at the 1968 Summer Olympics, the 1972 Summer Olympics and the 1976 Summer Olympics.

References

External links
 

1947 births
Living people
French male weightlifters
Olympic weightlifters of France
Weightlifters at the 1968 Summer Olympics
Weightlifters at the 1972 Summer Olympics
Weightlifters at the 1976 Summer Olympics
Sportspeople from Nancy, France
20th-century French people